Sergio Casal and Emilio Sánchez successfully defended their title by defeating Carl-Uwe Steeb and Michael Stich in the final, 5–7, 6–4, 6–3.

Seeds
The first four seeds received a bye into the second round.

Draw

Finals

Top half

Bottom half

References

External links
 Official results archive (ATP)
 Official results archive (ITF)

Doubles